The Actual were a four-piece alternative rock group from Los Angeles, California headed by guitarist and singer Max Bernstein. They were signed to Eyeball Records and released one album as a three-piece for the label, "Songs On Radio Idaho", before signing with Scott Weiland's label Softdrive Records.  They opened for the supergroup Velvet Revolver at the Aladdin Hotel in the summer of 2005 and also played the Volcom stage on the 2007 Warped Tour. In 2005, The Actual contributed two songs "Promised Land" and "Dancing On The Perimeter" to the film "Bewitched" (2005).

The Actual's second album In Stitches was released on May 31, 2007, on the Softdrive label. They promoted the album by touring as the opening act for Velvet Revolver on their Spring 2007 club tour. Weiland is the co-producer of In Stitches.  The album's first single, "This is the Worst Day of My Life," was selected as song-of-the-week on MySpace in late May 2007. In late 2007, The Actual parted ways.

Line-up
Max Bernstein- vocals, guitar
Rob Obee- drums
Jeremy Bonsall- bass
Ben Flanagan- guitar, vocals

Discography details

The Red EP (2001, Eyeball Records)
 Shells
 Cold Inside
 Big Trouble in Little China
 I Don't Want to Know
 Manhattan

Songs on Radio Idaho (2003, Eyeball Records)

Songs on Radio Idaho is the band's first album.  It was released on September 2, 2003, by Eyeball.

Songs on Radio Idaho track listing
 The Proof
 The Glow Wears Off
 Cold Inside
 Hospitality Girl
 Keep You in a Bottle
 A Way Around It
 I Am an Item
 So Long
 Cameron
 Across the Country
 When the Dishes Decide to Break 
 The Shines
 Radio Idaho

In Stitches (2007, Softdrive)
The Pride Of The Echelon
This Is The Worst Day Of My Life (Do You Want To Come Over)
 September Had A Trigger Finger
 If You See Her
 Permanent Kitten
 Needle Park
 To All The Plain Janes
 Between The Bridge And The Chapel
 Dancing On The Perimeter	
 Sending You A Signal
 Lindsay Never Gets Lonely
 Stay In My Rectangle
 Hospitality Girl

References

External links
The Actual's Website

Musical groups established in 2001
Musical groups disestablished in 2007
Alternative rock groups from California
2001 establishments in California